Russell Warren "Russ" Baker (born 1958) is an American author, and investigative journalist. Baker is the editor-in-chief and founder of the nonprofit news website WhoWhatWhy. He has written for a variety of publications, including The New York Times Magazine, The New Yorker, The Washington Post, Esquire, Vanity Fair, and The Village Voice.

Baker is the author of the 2008 book Family of Secrets that probes the Bush family and alleges connections between President George H.W. Bush and individuals involved with the assassination of President John F. Kennedy and the Watergate scandal. The book was poorly received by critics.

Baker's reporting has often been at variance with articles published in the mainstream media, and in 2015 he was described by journalist Ben Schreckinger as "a key player on the fringe."

Career
After graduation from the Graduate School of Journalism at Columbia University, Baker worked as a metro reporter with Newsday in New York City. While traveling abroad, he reported on tribal genocide in Burundi for a Dutch paper and the St. Louis Post-Dispatch, the fall of the Berlin Wall for CBS Radio and The Christian Science Monitor, and the fall of Romanian dictator Nicolae Ceausescu.

In 1989, he became a New York correspondent for The Christian Science Monitor. He also wrote for the Village Voice.

His articles included a report on the efforts of the Church of Scientology to recruit Michael Jackson, New York Times journalist Judith Miller’s reporting on weapons of mass destruction in Iraq, and the West’s indifference to capturing accused Serbian war criminal Radovan Karadzic. An article in The Nation on George W. Bush's military record received a 2005 award from the Deadline Club, the New York chapter of the Society of Professional Journalists, for a web-exclusive article.

In March 2010, he appeared before the "Treason in America Conference," a gathering of Sept. 11 truthers and said the 9/11 commission had “no credibility” and appeared "open to the possibility that 9/11 was an inside job." In 2014, he addressed a conference of the Assassination Archives and Research Center on the "role of the Warren Commission on the cover-up." In a 2016 profile, Baker defended appearing at assassination conferences "and defends doing so, despite the damage he realizes it does to his reputation" and to the credibility of his WhoWhatWhy website.

Baker has been on the adjunct faculty of the Columbia University Graduate School of Journalism and was a contributing editor to the Columbia Journalism Review. His media appearances have included occasional appearances on "conservative/libertarian radio talk shows, like the old Gene Burns Show on KGO in San Francisco and disgraced former Florida congressman Mark Foley’s erstwhile radio show on WSVU in Florida."

Departure from mainstream journalism 

In a January 2015 Boston magazine profile, journalist Ben Schreckinger said that over the previous decade, "Baker has abandoned the mainstream media and become a key player on the fringe, walking that murky line between conventional investigative journalist and wild-eyed conspiracy theorist."

Baker has raised questions about the Boston Marathon bombings, and "is not willing to rule out the possibility that the bombings were a false-flag operation conducted or permitted by elements of the American government in order to justify the Homeland Security complex.” He argues that FBI recruited the Boston Marathon bomber Tamerlan Tsarnaev as an agent or informant, which the FBI has categorically denied. Boston said "it would be a lot easier to dismiss Baker as a nut and move on if it weren’t for his three decades of award-winning investigative-reporting experience."

Los Angeles Times, media critic Tim Rutten said that Baker once may have been a serious and talented journalist but became “mesmerized by the idea of secrets and the Great Seduction. It causes you to lose your perspective and balance.” 

In a 2016 Columbia Journalism Review profile, journalist Neal Gabler reported that journalist Bill Moyers, who does not know Baker personally, called him an “indefatigable researcher from whom I could learn something about a subject that I hadn’t known." Baker told Gabler that in journalism, "everyone has been taught: Don’t go too far. Don’t dig too deep.” Gabler reported that Baker's critics reject that claim, and say that "reporters are warned not to go farther than the evidence warrants, and they say that what Baker sees as audacity is just a cover for sloppy reporting."

WhoWhatWhy 
Baker is the founder and editor-in-chief of the online website WhoWhatWhy, which specializes in "forensic journalism" and according to Baker, "embodies a form of investigative reporting that is rigorous, relentless and scientific." The site is aimed at exploring "deep politics," which he describes as "a vast, secret nexus of power and money that... the mainstream media dare not reveal because they are entwined in that same nexus."

The site is the "operating arm" of the Real News Project, Inc., a nonprofit. It relies on reader contributions and relies on the work of "a mix of paid journalists and skilled volunteers." As of 2016 it took in approximately $400,000 a year in revenues from about 1,000 contributors, and had roughly 600,000 unique visitors in 2015, far smaller than other news sites. Its donors have included Joan Konner, a former dean of the Columbia Journalism School, the Larsen Fund, which is operated in part by former Village Voice editor, Jonathan Larsen; and TV producer and activist Norman Lear.

Family of Secrets 

Baker's 2008  book Family of Secrets outlines historical connections of members of the Bush political dynasty, including Prescott Bush, President George H.W. Bush and President George W. Bush, to individuals in the Central Intelligence Agency, military-industrial complex and global financial system. Baker asserts that George H. W. Bush was linked to the Watergate scandal and the assassination of John F. Kennedy. Family of Secrets contends that the first President Bush became an intelligence agent in his teenage years and was later at the center of a plot to assassinate Kennedy that included his father, Prescott Bush, Vice President Lyndon B. Johnson, CIA Director Allen Dulles, Cuban and Russian exiles and emigrants, and various Texas oilmen.  It asserts that Bob Woodward of The Washington Post was an intelligence agent who conspired with John Dean to remove President Richard Nixon from office for opposing the oil depletion allowance.

In his 2015 profile of Baker, Schreckinger observed that the book was "trounced by the mainstream media". Lev Grossman of Time magazine said that Baker "connects the dots between the Bushes and Watergate, which he far-fetchedly describes not as a ham-handed act of political espionage but as a carefully orchestrated farce designed to take down President Richard Nixon." Washington Post reviewer Jamie Malanowski contended that Baker "overplayed his hand" and "stretches evidence," using rhetorical devices to do so. Malanowski opined that "there are more crutches in these pages than in the grotto at Lourdes.  In a Los Angeles Times review, Rutten called the book "preposterous" and said that it was "singularly offensive" because it "recklessly impugns, in the most disgusting possible way," the reputations of living and dead people.

In the 2019 anthology Conspiracies and Conspiracy Theories in American History, the authors observe that a CIA memo indicates that a "George Bush" was briefed on the Kennedy assassination. But the book describes as  "tenuous at best." Baker's claim that George H.W. Bush was connected to supposed CIA involvement in the assassination.

Personal life 
Baker grew up in Venice, California. His father, Len Baker, was a systems analyst in the aerospace industry who quit to join the peace movement and one summer sent him to work on a "work farm." His father's politics "rubbed off on Baker," who was quoted as telling Boston magazine that “Putting aside North Korea," he learned that “we may be the most propagandized country on Earth.” He graduated from UCLA with a major in political science, worked for a time in sales, and earned a master's degree in journalism from Columbia Journalism School.

Baker has declined to disclose his age, marital status, names of family members, or "anything that would make him more vulnerable to covert surveillance, intimidation, or worse." He also declines to state where he lives or works because he  does “sensitive investigative work” and doesn't want people showing up at his door.

References

External links
 RussBaker.com, Russ Baker website
 WhoWhatWhy.org website
 ProPublica Nonprofit Explorer listing for Real News Project, Inc.

Living people
9/11 conspiracy theorists
American conspiracy theorists
American investigative journalists
American male writers
American political writers
Columbia University Graduate School of Journalism alumni
John F. Kennedy conspiracy theorists
University of California, Los Angeles alumni
The Village Voice people
The Nation (U.S. magazine) people
1958 births
People from Venice, Los Angeles